Rochdale Metrolink station could refer to:

Rochdale Town Centre Metrolink station
Rochdale railway station Metrolink station